Petrosedum rupestre, also known as reflexed stonecrop, Jenny's stonecrop, blue stonecrop, stone orpine, prick-madam and trip-madam, is a species of perennial succulent flowering plant in the family Crassulaceae, native to northern, central, and southern Europe.

Description 
Petrosedum rupestre plants are typically up to 10 cm high, with sprawling stems and stiff foliage resembling spruce branches, with softer tissue. The leaves are frequently blue-gray to gray but range to light greens and yellows; the flowers are yellow. Like many Sedum species, it has a prostrate, spreading habit.

Cultivation
Petrosedum rupestre is a popular ornamental plant, grown in gardens, containers, and as houseplants. It is drought-tolerant.  There are named cultivars with variegated (multi-colored) leaves.  Through vegetative cloning it is propagated from cuttings.

This sedum is prone to fasciation (cristate forms), which produces attractive cactus-like forms, with irregular curves. However it reverts easily, so all normal offshoots need to be removed quickly to maintain the cristate form.

Petrosedum rupestre is occasionally used as a salad leaf or herb in Europe, including the United Kingdom. It is said to have a slightly astringent or sour taste.

References

 Sedum rupestre ‘Angelina’
 Cristate forms in Crassulaceae family, Peter Lapshin

External links 
 

Drought-tolerant plants
Flora of Denmark
Flora of France
Flora of Germany
Flora of Italy
Flora of Norway
Flora of Poland
Flora of Portugal
Flora of Slovakia
Flora of Spain
Flora of Sweden
Flora of Switzerland
Flora of the Czech Republic
Garden plants of Europe
Groundcovers
Plants described in 1755
reflexum
Taxa named by Carl Linnaeus